Oluwagbenga  Adedoyin Salu, who is simply known as Gbenga Salu, is a Nigerian film director, film editor and visual effects artist. He has won and also has been nominated for several awards for his music video productions. He enrolled for Mechanical Engineering, and then transferred to the Department of Creative Arts at the University of Lagos Nigeria, where he graduated in 2005. He is married to Temitope-Gbenga Salu (née Oshofisan) who is also a graduate of accounting from the University of Lagos. She is also a professional actress, voice over artiste and writer.

Gbenga studied film making at the London Film Academy. Some of the Awards he has won includes:
Best Special Effects/editing- Soundcity Music Video Awards (SMVA) - 2008
Most Promising Director- Nigerian Music Video Awards (NMVA) - 2009

Naijafootballers
In 2017, Gbenga founded Naijafootballers, an online platform that curates stories about Nigerian football and footballers. The platform is one of Nigeria's most followed sport platforms.

The Naijafootballers platform also gave birth to The Ballers Awards; an event that celebrates the best of Nigerian football. The test edition was held in 2018, it was hosted by Murphy Ijemba, while the maiden edition was on January 12, 2020. The second edition was hosted by FunnyBone and Debola Adebanjo, while the latest edition has Simi Drey and Emmanuel Sabastine has its hosts.

The widely celebrated Ballers Awards in the Nigerian sports industry is endorsed by the Nigeria Football Federation.

Music videos
His music video works include:
Ten ten - Mohits Allstars
Omoba - D'Prince
TWO Legit, Believe in me and Atewo - T.W.O (Tunde and wunmi Obe)
Tinko Angel - Jaywon
Viva Africa - Fela Anikulapo-Kuti
Change your parade - Lynxxx
Ayeole and six feet - Infinity
Omo Jayejaye - Lagbaja

Films
A Simple Plan (Short)
10:10 (Web Mini-series)
True Scarlet (TV Series)

References

Nigerian film directors
Living people
University of Lagos alumni
Year of birth missing (living people)
Nigerian film editors
Nigerian visual effects artists